1970 in sports describes the year's events in world sport.

Alpine skiing
 Alpine Skiing World Cup
 Men's overall season champion – Karl Schranz, Austria
 Women's overall season champion – Michèle Jacot, France

American football
 11 January – Super Bowl IV: the Kansas City Chiefs (AFL) won 23–7 over the Minnesota Vikings (NFL)
 Location: Tulane Stadium
 Attendance: 80,562
 MVP: Len Dawson, QB (Kansas City)
 Cotton Bowl (1969 season):
 The Texas Longhorns won 21–17 over the Notre Dame Fighting Irish to win the college football national championship
 16 June – death of Brian Piccolo, Chicago Bears player
 15 August – Patricia Palinkas becomes the first woman to play in a professional football game for the Orlando Panthers in the Atlantic Coast Football League.
 3 September – death of Vince Lombardi, Green Bay Packers coach; subsequently, his name is given to the Super Bowl trophy and the Rotary Lombardi Award
 2 October – The Wichita State University football team plane crash claims approximately half the football team when one of two planes crashes on the way to a game at Utah State University.
 14 November – A plane carrying most of the Marshall University team crashes just short of landing near Huntington, West Virginia, killing all 75 aboard, including 37 players.

Artistic gymnastics
 World Artistic Gymnastics Championships
 Men's all-around champion: Eizo Kenmotsu, Japan
 Women's all-around champion: Ludmilla Tourischeva, USSR
 Men's team competition champion: Japan
 Women's team competition champion: USSR

Athletics
 26 December – death from cancer of Lillian Board (22), British middle-distance runner
 July – 1970 Commonwealth Games held at Edinburgh
 December – 1970 Asian Games held at Bangkok

Baseball
 16 January – Gold Glove outfielder Curt Flood files a civil lawsuit challenging baseball's reserve clause, a suit that will have historic implications. Flood refused to report to the Phillies after he was traded by the Cardinals, contending the baseball rule violates federal antitrust laws.
 17 January – The Sporting News names Willie Mays as Player of the Decade for the 1960s.
 20 January – Lou Boudreau is elected to the Hall of Fame, receiving 232 of a possible 300 votes from the BBWAA.
 7 April – The Milwaukee Brewers play their first ever game as the Brewers at Milwaukee County Stadium, after the team had relocated from Seattle.
 12 June – Dock Ellis of the Pittsburgh Pirates throws a no-hitter against the San Diego Padres. It is later revealed that he did so while under the influence of LSD.
 Robert W. Peterson's book Only the Ball was White is published. The book brings pressure on Major League Baseball to recognize the African-American players from Negro league baseball by honoring its stars in the Baseball Hall of Fame.
 World Series – The American League's Baltimore Orioles win their second World Title by defeating the National League's Cincinnati Reds, 4 games to 1.

Basketball
 NCAA Men's Division I Basketball Championship –
 UCLA wins 80–69 over Jacksonville
 National Basketball Association –
 New York Knicks won 4 games to 3 over the Los Angeles Lakers in the 1970 NBA Finals
 1970 ABA Finals –
 Indiana Pacers defeat Los Angeles Stars 4 games to 2
 FIBA World Championship –
 Yugoslavia World Champion

Boxing
 15 February – Carlos Cruz, Featherweight Boxing Champion died in a plane crash
 16 February – Joe Frazier wins the undisputed World Heavyweight title with the knock out of Jimmy Ellis in five rounds.
 30 December – death of Sonny Liston (38), former heavyweight champion

Canadian football
 Grey Cup – Montreal Alouettes win 23–10 over the Calgary Stampeders
 Vanier Cup – Manitoba Bisons win 38–11 over the Ottawa Gee-Gees

Cricket
 6 January – Australia commences a controversial tour of South Africa.
 4 March – South Africa completes a 4–0 series whitewash over Australia at Port Elizabeth. This was to be South Africa's last Test match for 22 years.
 22 May – The British Government forces England to cancel the planned tour of England by South Africa.
 A "Rest of the World" team captained by Garry Sobers plays five unofficial Test matches against England winning the series 4–1.
 In their centenary year Kent wins the English County Championship for the first time since 1913.
 The International Cricket Conference votes to suspend South Africa from international cricket indefinitely because of its government's apartheid policy.

Cycling
 Giro d'Italia won by Eddy Merckx of Belgium
 Tour de France – Eddy Merckx of Belgium
 UCI Road World Championships – Men's road race – Jean-Pierre Monseré of Belgium

Field hockey
 Men's European Nations Cup held in Brussels and won by West Germany

Figure skating
 World Figure Skating Championships –
 Men's champion: Tim Wood, United States
 Ladies' champion: Gabrielle Seyfert, Germany
 Pair skating champions: Irina Rodnina & Alexei Ulanov, Soviet Union
 Ice dancing champions: Lyudmila Pakhomova & Alexandr Gorshkov, Soviet Union

Golf
Men's professional
 Masters Tournament – Billy Casper
 U.S. Open – Tony Jacklin
 British Open – Jack Nicklaus
 PGA Championship – Dave Stockton
 PGA Tour money leader – Lee Trevino – $157,037
Men's amateur
 British Amateur – Michael Bonallack
 U.S. Amateur – Lanny Wadkins
Women's professional
 LPGA Championship – Shirley Englehorn
 U.S. Women's Open – Donna Caponi
 Titleholders Championship – not played
 LPGA Tour money leader – Kathy Whitworth – $30,235

Harness racing
 Fresh Yankee was named "Horse of the Year" by the U.S. Trotting Association and the U.S. Harness Writers Association.
 Most Happy Fella won the United States Pacing Triple Crown races –
 Cane Pace – Most Happy Fella
 Little Brown Jug – Most Happy Fella
 Messenger Stakes – Most Happy Fella
 United States Trotting Triple Crown races –
 Hambletonian – Timothy T.
 Yonkers Trot – Victory Star
 Kentucky Futurity – Timothy T.
 Australian Inter Dominion Harness Racing Championship –
 Pacers: Bold David

Horse racing
 Nijinsky wins all three English Triple Crown Races and the Irish Derby
Steeplechases
 Cheltenham Gold Cup – L'Escargot
 Grand National – Gay Trip
Flat races
 Australia – Melbourne Cup won by Baghdad Note
 Canada – Queen's Plate won by Almoner
 France – Prix de l'Arc de Triomphe won by Sassafras
 Ireland – Irish Derby Stakes won by Nijinsky
 English Triple Crown Races:
 2,000 Guineas Stakes – Nijinsky
 The Derby – Nijinsky
 St. Leger Stakes – Nijinsky
 United States Triple Crown Races:
 Kentucky Derby – Dust Commander
 Preakness Stakes – Personality
 Belmont Stakes – High Echelon

Ice hockey
 Art Ross Trophy – Bobby Orr becomes the first defenseman in the history of the National Hockey League to lead the league in scoring.
 Hart Memorial Trophy for the NHL's Most Valuable Player: Bobby Orr, Boston Bruins
 Stanley Cup – Boston Bruins win the Cup for the first time in 29 years, defeating the St. Louis Blues four games to none. Defenseman, Bobby Orr is awarded the Conn Smythe Trophy as the series MVP (most valuable player).
 World Hockey Championship
 Men's champion: Soviet Union defeated Sweden
 NCAA Men's Ice Hockey Championship – Cornell University Big Red defeat Clarkson University Golden Knights 6–4 in Lake Placid, New York; only NCAA hockey team to complete season undefeated and untied (31–0)

Lacrosse
 STX is founded by Richard B.C. Tucker Sr.
 The New Westminster Salmonbellies win the Mann Cup.
 The Whitby Transporters win the Castrol Cup.
 The Lakeshore Maple Leafs win the Minto Cup.

Motorsport

Rugby league
 15 March – the final match of the 1969–70 European Championship is played, with England crowned champions for finishing on top of the league
 19 September – the 1970 NSWRFL season culminates with South Sydney's 23–12 Grand Final victory over Manly-Warringah
 8 November – the 1970 World Cup is won by Australia, who defeated Great Britain 12–7 in the final

Snooker
 World Snooker Championship – Ray Reardon beats John Pulman 37–33

Speed skating
 First ISU Sprint Speed Skating Championships for Men and Ladies held in West Allis, U.S.A.

Swimming
 22 August – US swimmer Mark Spitz breaks his own, nearly three-year-old world record in the men's 200m butterfly (long course) with a time of 2:05.4. At the same meet and on the same day in Los Angeles, California he loses it to Gary Hall Sr., who swims 2:05.0.

Tennis
 Grand Slam in tennis men's results:
 Australian Open – Arthur Ashe
 French Open – Jan Kodeš
 Wimbledon championships – John Newcombe
 US Open – Ken Rosewall
 Margaret Court wins the Grand Slam in women's tennis –
 Australian Open – Margaret Court
 French Open – Margaret Court
 Wimbledon championships – Margaret Court
 US Open – Margaret Court
 Davis Cup – United States wins 5–0 over Germany F.R. in world tennis.

Volleyball
 1970 FIVB Men's World Championship held in Sofia and won by East Germany

Yacht racing
 The New York Yacht Club retains the America's Cup as Intrepid defeats Australian challenger Gretel II, of the Royal Sydney Yacht Squadron, 4 races to 1.

Multi-sport events
 Sixth Asian Games held in Bangkok, Thailand
 1970 British Commonwealth Games held in Edinburgh, Scotland
 Central American and Caribbean Games held in Panama City, Panama
 Sixth Summer Universiade held in Turin, Italy
 Sixth Winter Universiade held in Rovaniemi, Finland

Awards
 Associated Press Male Athlete of the Year – George Blanda, National Football League
 Associated Press Female Athlete of the Year – Chi Cheng, Track and field

References

 
Sports by year